William Doyle is an Irish businessman and current chief executive of Newbridge Silverware, a cutlery and giftware manufacturer based in Newbridge, County Kildare.

Early life and education 
Doyle grew up in Co. Kildare and was educated at Newbridge College. He studied Business Studies and Economics at Trinity College Dublin.

Career 
William Doyle took over as CEO of Newbridge Silverware from his father, Dominic Doyle, in 1993 when he died. The company had a turnover of €27 million in 2007.

Doyle was nominated for the 2005 Ernst & Young Entrepreneur of the Year award in the Industry category.

References

Living people
People educated at Newbridge College
Irish businesspeople
Irish chief executives
Year of birth missing (living people)